On 9 May 2017, two bombs exploded at a Big C supermarket in Pattani, Thailand. Some 80 people were confirmed injured, some seriously and no deaths were reported. Most of the wounded received treatment at the scene, but 21 people were taken to hospital with serious injuries.

Attack
The attack took place around 2:50 PM Thai time (07:50 UTC) when the first bomb planted on a motorcycle occurred near the entrance at the Big C supermarket. 10 minutes later, a second blast a larger and more powerful explosion which was planted inside a bag on a pickup truck, exploded occurred outside the building entrance. 

Before that, the Big C supermarket here was bombed twice before. The first time on 1 August 2005 and the second one took place on 11 March 2012.

Suspects
Thai police suspected that the perpetrators were most likely Pattani Muslim separatists. On 10 May, Pattani Police initially believed that three groups of six people were involved in the bombings. A massive manhunt has been launched for four men who were allegedly involved in the twin blasts, who had suspected links to Barisan Revolusi Nasional.

See also
 South Thailand insurgency

References

2017 in Thailand
South Thailand insurgency
Terrorist incidents in Asia in 2017
Car and truck bombings in Asia
Improvised explosive device bombings in Thailand
Islamic terrorism in Thailand
Religiously motivated violence in Thailand
Terrorist incidents in Thailand
May 2017 crimes in Asia
2017 crimes in Thailand
Attacks on supermarkets
Building bombings in Thailand